Saint-Genest-Malifaux is a small town in the Auvergne-Rhône-Alpes region of central France. Administratively it is designated a commune within the department of Loire.

Population

See also
Communes of the Loire department

References

Communes of Loire (department)